Arthur Strong Wightman (March 30, 1922 – January 13, 2013) was an American mathematical physicist. He was one of the founders of the axiomatic approach to quantum field theory, and originated the set of Wightman axioms. With his rigorous treatment of quantum field theories, he promoted research on various aspects of modern mathematical physics.

Biography 
Arthur Wightman was born on March 30, 1922, in Rochester, in New York. He studied at the Yale University and in 1942 he earned a bachelor's degree in physics. In 1949 he received his doctorate at the Princeton University under the supervision of John Wheeler. He intended to graduate with Eugene Wigner, but he was spending most of his time at the Oak Ridge National Laboratory. In the early 1950s, he started as a young instructor in the Princeton Physics department and later became the Thomas D. Jones Professor of Mathematical Physics, in 1971. He retired in 1992 as professor emeritus. In the years 1951-1952 and 1956-1957 he was a visiting researcher at the University of Copenhagen at the Niels Bohr Institute, where he worked in particular with Gunnar Källén and Lars Gårding. In 1957 he was at the University of Paris and in the years 1963-1964 and 1968-1969 at the Institut des Hautes Études Scientifiques. Between 1977 and 1978 he was visiting professor at the École Polytechnique in Paris and in 1982 at the University of Adelaide.

Wightman has been married twice. His first wife, Anna-Greta Larsson, was an artist and photographer and died early. They had a daughter, Robin, who also died prematurely. The second wife was the Bulgarian translator Ludmilla Popova Wightman. Wightman died on January 13, 2013, in Princeton, in New Jersey.

Scientific career 
Already during his undergraduate studies, Arthur Wightman had close contacts with the mathematics department in Princeton. Together with the mathematician John Tate, Wightman was engaged in the work on the Lorentz and Poincaré groups representations.

In the 1950s, he introduced his famous Wightman axioms as a mathematical foundation to relativistic quantum field theory. Quantum fields are treated as distributions in space-time. The Hilbert space carries a unitary representation of the Poincaré group under which the field operators transform covariantly. Res Jost was able to derive the PCT and the spin-statistics theorems, as shown in Wightman's and Streater's book. Together with Eugene Wigner and Gian-Carlo Wick, he introduced superselection rules and studied the representations of commutator and anti-commutator algebras with the mathematician Lars Gårding.

Honors and awards 
In 1969 Arthur Wightman was awarded the Dannie Heineman Prize for Mathematical Physics for founding and contributing in developing axiomatic quantum field theory and in 1997 the Henri Poincaré Prize of the International Association of Mathematical Physics for his central role in the foundations of the general theory of quantum fields. Since 1964 he was a fellow of the American Physical Society, since 1966 of the American Academy of Arts and Sciences, and since 1970 of the United States National Academy of Sciences. In 1962 he was an invited speaker at the International Congress of Mathematicians in Stockholm. In 1976 he was Josiah Willard Gibbs Lecturer.

Selected publications

See also 

 Axiomatic quantum field theory
 Hilbert's sixth problem
 PCT Theorem
 Principle of locality
 Quantum field theory
 Wightman axioms

References

Further reading

External links 

 .
 .
 .
 
 
 
 

American physicists
1922 births
2013 deaths
People from Rochester, New York
Fellows of the American Physical Society
Members of the United States National Academy of Sciences
Mathematical physicists
Princeton University alumni
Scientists from New York (state)
Yale College alumni